Ahmad Sunarto (born 18 May 1990) is an Indonesian professional footballer who plays as a forward for Liga 2 club PSKC Cimahi. He already scored one goal for Indonesia under-23 team in the 2013 Islamic Solidarity Games against Palestine on 23 September 2013. He scored from a penalty kick.

International goals
Sunarto: International under-23 goals

Honours

Club honors
Arema 
 Indonesia Super League: 2009–10
 Menpora Cup: 2013
 Indonesian Inter Island Cup: 2014/15
 Indonesia President's Cup: 2017, 2019

Country honors
Indonesia U-23
Islamic Solidarity Games  Silver medal: 2013

References

External links 
 Sunarto at Soccerway

Indonesian footballers
Living people
1990 births
Sportspeople from Malang
Arema F.C. players
Persis Solo players
Persiba Balikpapan players
Liga 1 (Indonesia) players
Association football wingers
Association football forwards